Merritt is a surname.

Notable people with the surname

A
A. Merritt (1884–1943), American writer
Ahmad Merritt (born 1977), American football player
Amber Merritt (born 1993), Australian wheelchair basketball player
Anna Lea Merritt (1844–1930), American artist
Aries Merritt (born 1985), American hurdler

B
Bill Merritt (disambiguation), multiple people
Bob Merritt, American pastor
Bob Merritt (1945–2011), Australian writer
Bruce Merritt (born 1958), American canoeist

C
Charles Merritt (1908–2000), Canadian lieutenant colonel
Chris Merritt (born 1952), American opera singer
Chris Merritt (American football), American football coach
Clifton R. Merritt (1919–2008), American wildlife advocate
Constance Merritt (born 1966), American poet

D
Dave Merritt (born 1971), American football player
David Merritt (born 1955), American astrophysicist
Dicky Merritt (1897–1978), English footballer
Dixon Lanier Merritt (1879–1972), American poet and humorist
Donna Marie Merritt (born 1965), American poet
Doris Honig Merritt (1923–2022), American civil servant and physician

E
Earl J. Merritt (1896–1986), American athletic coach
Edwin Merritt (disambiguation), multiple people
Emma Frances Grayson Merritt (1860–1933), American educator
Ernest Merritt (1865–1948), American academic administrator

F
Francis E. Merritt (1920–1995), American football player
Francis Sumner Merritt (1913–2000), American painter, and co-founder of Haystack Mountain School of Crafts

G
George Merritt (disambiguation), multiple people
Gilbert S. Merritt Jr. (1936–2022), American lawyer and jurist

H
H. Houston Merritt (1902–1979), American neurologist
Harold Merritt (born 1951), American basketball coach
Harry Meritt (1920–2004), English footballer
H. E. Merritt (1899–1974), British engineer
Herman Merritt (1900–1927), American baseball player
Howard Sutermeister Merritt (1915–2007), American art historian
Hulett C. Merritt (1872–1956), American businessman

J
Jack N. Merritt (1930–2018), American general
James Merritt (born 1952), American religious leader
James Merritt (born 1976), British radio presenter
James Merritt (Australian politician) (1856–1943), English-Australian politician
Jeff Merritt (born 1978), American tech advisor
Jeralyn Merritt (born 1949), American attorney
Jim Merritt (born 1943), American baseball player
Jim Merritt (politician) (born 1959), American politician
Jody Merritt, American brigadier general
John Merritt (disambiguation), multiple people
Josiah Merritt (?–1882), American pioneer
Jymie Merritt (1926–2020), American bassist

K
Katharine Krom Merritt (1886–1986), American physician
Kelsey Merritt (born 1996), Filipino-American model
Kim Merritt (born 1955), American runner
Kirk Merritt (born 1997), American football player

L
LaShawn Merritt (born 1986), American sprinter
Lee Merritt, American lawyer
Leonidas Merritt (1844–1926), American businessman and politician
Les Merritt (born 1951), American politician
Lewie G. Merritt (1897–1974), American aviator
Lloyd Merritt (born 1933), American baseball player

M
Marcus M. Merritt (1839–1916), American businessman and politician
Mark Daniel Merritt (born 1961), American composer
Marshall Merritt (1904–1978), American painter
Mary E. Merritt (1881–1953), American nurse
Matthew Merritt (disambiguation), multiple people
Max Merritt (1941–2020), New Zealand singer-songwriter
Mel Merritt (1897–1986), American football player
Michael Merritt (disambiguation), multiple people
Myra Merritt, American soprano

N
Natacha Merritt (born 1977), American photographer
Nathan Merritt (born 1983), Australian rugby league footballer
Neil Merritt (born 1939), American academic administrator
Nikki Merritt (born 1972), American politician

P
Pamela Merritt, American writer

R
Raimi Merritt (born 1993), American wakeboarder
Rich Merritt (born 1967), American activist
Robert Merritt (1936–1999), Canadian playwright
Robert James "Bob" Merritt (1945–2011), Australian writer
Ryan Merritt (born 1992), American baseball player

S
Samuel Merritt (disambiguation), multiple people
Schute Merritt (1910/1911–1988), American baseball player
Schuyler Merritt (1853–1953), American politician
Scott Merritt, Canadian singer-songwriter
Stephanie Merritt (born 1974), British critic and feature writer
Stephin Merritt (born 1966), American singer-songwriter
Steve Merritt (1945–1993), American dancer

T
Theresa Merritt (1924–1998), American actress
Thomas Merritt (disambiguation), multiple people
Tift Merritt (born 1975), American singer-songwriter
Tim Merritt (born 1982), American soccer player
Tione Merritt (born 2001), American rapper
Tommy Merritt (born 1948), American politician
Tripp Merritt (born 1968), American football coach
Troy Merritt (born 1985), American golfer

W
W. Davis Merritt, American journalist
Wesley Merritt (1836–1910), American general
Whitey Merritt (1869–1916), Canadian ice hockey player
Wilf Merritt (1864–?), English footballer
William Merritt (disambiguation), multiple people
Willie Merritt (1872–1961), American football player

See also
Senator Merritt (disambiguation), senators surnamed "Merritt"

English-language surnames